Leivanectes is a genus of plesiosaurs of the family Elasmosauridae known from Late Aptian marine deposits in central Colombia. It contains a single species, L. bernadoi, which was described in 2019.

Description 
Leivanectes differs from Callawayasaurus, which has been found in the same formation, in having fewer mandibular alveoli and a short mandibular symphysis with three alveoli (5 in Callawayasaurus).

Distribution 
Leivanectes remains have been found in the fossiliferous Paja Formation of the Altiplano Cundiboyacense, which crops out near Villa de Leyva, also written as Villa de Leiva, Boyaca, Colombia. The genus name refers to Villa de Leiva.

See also 

 List of plesiosaur genera
 Timeline of plesiosaur research

References 

Elasmosaurids
Early Cretaceous plesiosaurs
Early Cretaceous reptiles of South America
Plesiosaurs of South America
Cretaceous Colombia
Fossils of Colombia
Altiplano Cundiboyacense
Paja Formation
Fossil taxa described in 2019
Taxa named by María Páramo
Taxa named by Zulma Brandoni de Gasparini
Sauropterygian genera